Georgios Matzourakis  (born 29 December 1983) is a Greek former professional footballer who played as a right-back.

Career
Born in Athens, Matzourakis began playing football for Odysseas Anagennisi F.C. in the Delta Ethniki. He later played in the Beta Ethniki for Pierikos F.C., Chaidari F.C. and Egaleo F.C.

References

External links
Profile at Onsports.gr

1983 births
Living people
Egaleo F.C. players
Pierikos F.C. players
Association football defenders
Footballers from Athens
Greek footballers